McKinley College was a degree-granting post-secondary distance education institution, with headquarters in Fort Collins, Colorado. The college was founded in 2005, and was owned and operated by Weston Distance Learning, Inc. The college ceased operation on August 20, 2020.

Accreditation
McKinley College was nationally accredited by the Distance Education Accrediting Commission (DEAC), an accrediting agency which is approved by the U.S. Department of Education (USDE) and recognized by the Council for Higher Education Accreditation (CHEA). McKinley College was also an Accredited Member of the Better Business Bureau and had an A+ rating.

Academics

McKinley College offered online associate degree programs in Accounting, Business Management, E-commerce, Entrepreneurship, Fashion Merchandising, Financial Services Management, Human Resource Management, Social Work, Health Information Technology, Medical Specialties and Marketing.

All AAS degree programs were career focused and the school emphasized the relevance of its program content to each specific field.

References

External links
McKinley College official website

Distance education institutions based in the United States
Distance Education Accreditation Commission
Educational institutions established in 2005
Education in Fort Collins, Colorado
Education in Larimer County, Colorado
2005 establishments in Colorado